Peter John Gresham  (born 7 July 1933) is a former New Zealand politician. He was a Member of Parliament from 1990 to 1999, representing the National Party.

Early life
Gresham was born in Geraldine in 1933 and attended St. Kevins College in Oamaru. Before entering politics, Gresham was an accountant.

Political career

Gresham was first elected to Parliament in the 1990 election as MP for Waitotara, and then re-elected in the 1993 election. At the 1996 election, the bulk of his Waitotara seat was merged with Wanganui to create the new seat of Whanganui, and Gresham was defeated by Jill Pettis of the Labour Party. Gresham remained in Parliament as a list MP, but retired at the 1999 election.

From 1993 to 1996, he served as Minister of Social Welfare and Minister of Senior Citizens.

Honours
In the 2002 Queen's Birthday and Golden Jubilee Honours, Gresham was appointed an Officer of the New Zealand Order of Merit, for public services. He is a Knight of Malta, a Catholic religious military order.

References

1933 births
Living people
New Zealand Roman Catholics
Members of the New Zealand House of Representatives
Members of the Cabinet of New Zealand
New Zealand accountants
New Zealand National Party MPs
People educated at St Kevin's College, Oamaru
New Zealand list MPs
People from Geraldine, New Zealand
New Zealand MPs for North Island electorates
Officers of the New Zealand Order of Merit
New Zealand justices of the peace